Tawny Cypress is an American actress. She has appeared in various television and stage plays. She starred as art dealer Simone Deveaux on the TV series Heroes. She previously held roles on several TV series, including Fox's drama K-Ville as Ginger "Love Tap" LeBeau, Carly Heath on House of Cards, and Cherie Rollins-Murray on the second and third seasons of the CBS series Unforgettable. In 2019, Cypress starred as Inez in the film Inez & Doug & Kira, for which she has received critical acclaim. Since 2021, Cypress has starred as Taissa Turner on Showtime's Yellowjackets.

Early life 
Tawny Cypress was born in Point Pleasant, New Jersey. She spent her childhood living in communities along the Jersey Shore, including the towns of Sea Girt, Belmar and Red Bank. She attended Mason Gross School of the Arts at Rutgers University. Cypress also attended William Esper Studio, where she was invited to teach in 2020.

Career 
Since 2000, she has been actively working in film and television. In 2021, Cypress was cast on Yellowjackets as Taissa Turner, a survivor of a horrific plane crash in the 1990s, now running for the New Jersey State Senate while trying to keep quiet the demons of eighteen months of survival in the Canadian wilderness.

Personal life 
Cypress's mother is of Hungarian descent and her father was black and Native American, a partial descendent of the Accawmacke Nation of the Eastern Shore of Virginia. Cypress still resides in her native New Jersey. Her brother is comic book artist Toby Cypress. Since 2011, she has been married to Tom Dillon. They have one child and reside in New Jersey with their many dogs and cats.

Cypress revealed in the documentary Queer for Fear that she is attracted to women.

Filmography

Film

Television

References

External links
 

Actresses from New Jersey
Living people
People from Point Pleasant, New Jersey
21st-century American actresses
American television actresses
American film actresses
American stage actresses
American people of Hungarian descent
African-American actresses
21st-century African-American women
21st-century African-American people
American people of Native American descent
Year of birth missing (living people)
LGBT African Americans
LGBT people from New Jersey